Marcus Wesley Wilkins (born January 2, 1980) is a former American football linebacker. He was originally signed by the Green Bay Packers as an undrafted free agent in 2002. He played college football at Texas.

Early years
Wilkins attended Westwood High School in Austin, Texas and was a student and a three-year starter in football. He played linebacker and moved to strong safety in his senior year. He would then play football for Texas. His mother is Gigi Bryant.

College career
Wilkins attended the University of Texas and was a four-year letterman in football.

External links
Green Bay Packers bio

1980 births
Living people
Players of American football from Austin, Texas
American football defensive ends
American football linebackers
Texas Longhorns football players
Green Bay Packers players
Arizona Cardinals players
Cincinnati Bengals players
Atlanta Falcons players